This is a list of people who have been identified as Marinist poets, or marinisti — largely 17th century followers of Giambattista Marino (1569–1625). It comes from the Italian Wikipedia article.

A
 Bartolomeo Abbati
 Cesare Abbelli
 Antonio Abbondanti
 Paolo Abriani
 Claudio Achillini
 Alessandro Adimari
 Agostino Agostini
 Carlo Agudi
 Giovanni Albano
 Lorenzo Alberti
 Girolamo Aleandro, the younger
 Ludovico Aleardi
 Alessandro Aligieri
 Michelangelo Angelico il Vecchio
 Gherardo Ansaldi
 Ciro Anselmi
 Alessandro Arcadio
 Vincenzo Pio Arcadio
 Angelo Maria Arcioni
 Antonio Arcoleo
 Giovanni Argoli
 Antonio Armanini
 Francesco Arnassini
 Giuseppe Artale
 Tommaso Aversa

B
 Arcangelo Michele Baccaretti
 Camillo Badovero
 Antonio Bagatti
 Marc'Antonio Balcianelli
 Francesco Balducci
 Ottavio Ballada
 Bartolomeo Barbato
 Andrea Barbazza
 Bartolo Bartolini
 Andrea Baruzzi
 Giambattista Basile
 Antonio Basso
 Giuseppe Battista
 Ascanio Belforti
 Giovanni Antonio Bellavite
 Francesco Belli
 Guido Ubaldo Benamati
 Giovanni Battista Bergazzano
 Pietro Antonio Bernardoni
 Giovanni Battista Bertani
 Giacinto Bertano
 Fausto Bertoldi
 Giovanni Daniele Bertoli
 Giovanni Bertucci
 Giuliano Bezzi
 Camaleonte Biancardi
 Bartolomeo Bilotta
 Bellino Bisellini
 Pietro Paolo Bissari
 Camillo Boccaccio
 Domizio Bombarda
 Baldassarre Bonifacio
 Giovan Francesco Bonomi
 Giulio Cesare Bordoni
 Giovanni Battista Brati
 Anton Giulio Brignole-Sale
 Antonio Bruni
 Girolamo Brusoni
 Bartolomeo Burchelati
 Giovan Francesco Busenello

C
 Vito Cesare Caballoni
 Francesco Maria Caccianemici
 Scipione Caetano
 Giovanni Battista Calamai
 Giuseppe Campanile
 Annibale Campeggi
 Ridolfo Campeggi
 Giovanni Canale
 Porfirio Canozza
 Francesco Antonio Cappone
 Giovanni Capponi
 Giovanni Battista Capponi
 Lorenzo Casaburi Urries
 Pietro Casaburi Urries
 Giacomo Castellani
 Settimio Castellari
 Francesco Cavalli
 Giovanni Paolo Cechini
 Pietro Martire Colla
 Francesco Contarini il Giovane
 Nicolò Coradini il Vecchio
 Elena Lucrezia Cornaro Piscopia
 Antonio Costantini
 Toldo Costantini
 Lorenzo Crasso
 Nicolò Crasso
 Biagio Cusano

D
 Giovanni Pietro D'Alessandro
 Domenico David
 Ludovico Della Chiesa
 Francesco Della Valle
 Camillo De Notariis
 Francesco Dentice
 Gasparo De Simeonibus
 Agazio di Somma
 Francesco Dolci
 Giuseppe Domenichi
 Ferdinando Donno
 Bartolomeo Dotti

E
 Filocritilo Elpizi
 Scipione Errico

F
 Giovanni Stefano Fachinelli
 Francesco Ferrari
 Mario Fiorentini
 Girolamo Fiumagioli
 Girolamo Fontanella
 Antonio Fortini
 Francesco Fresco Di Cucagna
 Agostino Fusconi

G
 Jacopo Gaddi
 Antonino Galeani
 Paganino Gaudenzio
 Tommaso Gaudiosi
 Giulio Cesare Gigli
 Marcello Giovanetti
 Domenico Gisberti
 Riniero Grillenzoni
 Gennaro Grosso
 Hermete de' Gualandi
 Francesco Maria Gualterotti
 Giuseppe Guerrieri

I
 Giovanni Vincenzo Imperiali
 Gabriele Giovanni Irnei
 Cristoforo Ivanovich

L
 Giovanni Giacomo Lavagna
 Fabio Leonida
 Giacomo Litegato
 Giovanni Battista Lopez Visconte
 Giovanni Francesco Loredano
 Giacomo Lubrano
 Martino Lunghi

M
 Marcello Macedonio
 Benedetto Maia
 Giovan Francesco Maia Materdona
 Giovanni Battista Mamiani
 Giovanni Battista Manso
 Filippo Marcheselli
 Paolo Marchesi Vedoa
 Bernardino Mariscotti
 Francesco Martinello
 Francesco Melosio
 Federico Meninni
 Leonardo Miari
 Pietro Michiele
 Faustino Moisesso
 Bernardo Morando
 Giovanni Battista Moroni
 Liberale Motense
 Gaspare Murtola
 Antonio Muscettola

N
 Anton Maria Narducci

O
 Giovanni Battista Oddoni
 Cesare Orsini
 Pietro Francesco Orsini

P
 Arrigo Palladio
 Pier Francesco Paoli
 Giovanni Battista Paolucci
 Pace Pasini
 Giovanni Pasta
 Andrea Perrucci
 Ciro di Pers
 Pietro Matteo Petrucci
 Giulio Piccolomini
 Baldassarre Pisani
 Giovanni Pomo
 Francesco Pona
 Girolamo Preti
 Giovanni Battista Pucci

Q
 Leonardo Quirini

R
 Licinio Racani
 Giovanni Paolo Rainaldi
 Giovanni Giacomo Ricci
 Cesare Rinaldi
 Marc'Antonio Romagnesi
 Michelangelo Romagnesi
 Marc'Antonio Romiti
 Ottavio Rossi
 Giovanni Andrea Rovetti

S
 Giuseppe Salomoni
 Scipio Sambiasi
 Gentile Albertino principe di Sanseverino
 Andrea Santamaria
 Francesco Maria Santinelli
 Fortuniano Sanvitale
 Giovanni Matteo Savio
 Giovanni Battista Sbroiavacca
 Lorenzo Scoto
 Giuseppe Girolamo Semenzi
 Giovan Leone Sempronio
 Bartolomeo Sereni
 Pari Severini
 Domenico Antonio Speranza
 Ermes Stampa
 Tommaso Stigliani
 Francesco Stradiotti
 Giulio Strozzi

T
 Crisostomo Talenti
 Antonio Francesco Tempestini
 Emanuele Tesauro
 Ludovico Tingoli
 Michelangelo Torcigliani
 Filippo Antonio Torelli
 Domenico Torricella
 Bartolomeo Tortoletti
 Domenico Treccio
 Ottavio Tronsarelli

V
 Giovanni Francesco Valloni
 Adriano Verdizzotti
 Giambattista Vidali
 Nicola Villani
 Matteo di Stefano Vitale

Z
 Marc'Antonio Zambeccari
 Cesare Zarotti
 Paolo Zazzaroni
 Gabriele Zinani
 Vincenzo Zito

External links 
 
Repertorio della poesia italiana tra cinquecento e seicento

Italian poets
Marinism
Lists of poets
Baroque writers

it:Marinisti